Coffee Bean Bears, are a coffee bean stuffed bear created by brothers Christopher Esposito and Artie Esposito in 2003 through their company ESPO Entertainment (DBA Coffee Bean Bears).  The initial assortment of bears featured four characters: Brewster Bean, Frenchie Vanilla, Mister Mocha, and Hazel "The Nut".  Each of the bears is stuffed, in its midsection only, with organically grown, roasted coffee beans of the appropriate flavor (Frenchie Vanilla comes with French vanilla beans, etc.).  The rest of the bear is filled with polyester stuffing.

The beans themselves are said to be not meant for consumption, but are instead used to give off an aroma – in other words, a type of potpourri for coffee drinkers.  They come packed in a removable netted bag, which is placed inside the back of the bear through a Velcro opening.  The coffee's fragrance comes through the bears’ bellies, which are made of a burlap/jute material.  The porous nature of the material allows for emission of the scent.  In addition to the whole beans themselves, a sample pack of ground coffee (again, of the appropriate flavor) is included.

Each of the bears comes with an attached coaster, which takes the place of the traditional cardboard/paper nametag.  The "Coaster of Authenticity", as they refer to it, is made of the same burlap as the bears’ bellies, and includes a cartoon drawing of the matching bear.  Each coaster is also numbered, which appeals to some collectors, though whether or not any of the bears are limited is not yet known.

All the components come packaged together in a tin reminiscent of a coffee can.  The cans themselves provide technical information, such as the story of the specific bear enclosed, as well as a description of the beans, and the charity Coffee Kids, which benefits from a percentage of the proceeds.

Unlike other beanie type plush, these bears are not meant for babies or young children.  They are primarily an adult or teen collectible, intended for the avid coffee drinker or teddy bear collector.  While not as expensive as other niche products such as the very popular Vermont Teddy Bear collection, at a suggested retail price of $19.95 these bears are higher priced than the more common Ty Beanie Babies.

The "Brewster Bean" bear was nominated for the 2007 Golden Teddy Award buy Jones Publishing
in the "Dressed/Accessorized, 5-14 inches" category.

"Brother" Bears

Two of the stars of CBS' Big Brother, Will Kirby (winner of Big Brother 2) and Mike "Boogie" Malin (winner of Big Brother All-Stars) are investors in Coffee Bean Bears.  Throughout the "All-Stars" season, Kirby and Malin would promote the product to internet fans via the 24-hour live video feeds.  They (as well as other "Houseguests") would occasionally wear T-shirts promoting the Coffee Bean Bears cast of characters.

The Logistics Manager Joel Martin for Coffee Bean Bears would often feature the bears and shout outs to the Big Brother crew in his blog and YouTube Videos in the Scooter Industry since many US Scooter Stores sold espresso and coffee. He was also the Spanish Language pitchman on Spanish Language QVC Shop Latino.

References

Teddy bears
Privately held companies based in Florida